Beyuz (also Romanized as Beyūẕ; also known as Baiyūr, Beyūẕ-e Yek, and Boyūz) is a village in Gheyzaniyeh Rural District, in the Central District of Ahvaz County, Khuzestan Province, Iran. At the 2006 census, its population was 118, in 17 families.

References 

Populated places in Ahvaz County